Seion Darrell (born January 16, 1986) is a Bermudian football player who currently plays for local side Dandy Town Hornets.

Club career
Darrell has been part of the Bermuda Hogges squad in the USL Second Division since 2007; he remained with the team when the Hogges self-relegated to the USL Premier Development League in 2010. He also had a spell at Canadian college team CBU Capers, playing alongside six compatriots.

International career
He made his debut for Bermuda in a May 2005 friendly match against Trinidad and Tobago and earned a total of 12 caps, scoring no goals. He has represented his country in four FIFA World Cup qualification matches. Darrell played in Bermuda's 3–1 victory over the Cayman Islands on March 30, 2008 in qualifying for the 2010 FIFA World Cup.

His final international match was a September 2012 CONCACAF Gold Cup qualification match against Puerto Rico.

References

External links

1986 births
Living people
Association football defenders
Bermudian footballers
Bermuda international footballers
Bermuda Hogges F.C. players
Dandy Town Hornets F.C. players
USL Second Division players
USL League Two players
Bermudian expatriate footballers
Expatriate soccer players in Canada
Bermudian expatriate sportspeople in Canada